The 2006 Australian motorcycle Grand Prix was the fourteenth race of the 2006 Grand Prix motorcycle racing season. It took place on the weekend of 15–17 September 2006 at the Phillip Island Grand Prix Circuit.

MotoGP classification

250 cc classification

125 cc classification

Championship standings after the race (MotoGP)

Below are the standings for the top five riders and constructors after round fourteen has concluded.

Riders' Championship standings

Constructors' Championship standings

 Note: Only the top five positions are included for both sets of standings.

References

Australian motorcycle Grand Prix
Australian
Motorcycle
Motorsport at Phillip Island